David James Morton (born 24 September 1953 in Eccles, Lancashire, England) is a former international motorcycle speedway rider who started his career with the Crewe Kings. He represented England at test level.  His brother Chris Morton was also a speedway rider.

He was signed by Hackney Hawks in 1973 from Crewe Kings but missed almost the entire 1977 season with a broken leg.  He requested a transfer in 1978 and was swapped for Finn Thomsen from Wolverhampton Wolves.

He won the New Zealand Championship in 1975. He was also British Finalist (1975, 1976, 1978, 1980) and New Zealand Champion (1975).

He retired in 1988.

Morton now works for Swissport (formerly Servisair) at Manchester Airport as a technician on the ground support equipment for the aircraft when they are at the airport terminal. He lives in Manchester with his partner, Bernadette.

He likes music, especially blues and rock and bluegrass and plays a bit of banjo. He is the author of a memoir about his time in Speedway "Tapes, Breaks and Heartaches".

External links 
 Hackney Hawks Website

References 

1953 births
Living people
British speedway riders
English motorcycle racers
Hackney Hawks riders
Wolverhampton Wolves riders
Sheffield Tigers riders
Ellesmere Port Gunners riders
Crewe Kings riders
Newcastle Diamonds riders
Reading Racers riders
People from Eccles, Greater Manchester